Fleischmannia is a genus of flowering plant in the family Asteraceae. The name honours Gottfried F. Fleischmann (1777–1850), the teacher of Carl Heinrich Schultz at University of Erlangen–Nuremberg. Members of the genus are native to South, Central, and North America, with some species found as far north as Virginia and Illinois.  They are commonly known as thoroughworts.

Fleischmannia is in the tribe Eupatorieae and as such has flower heads with disc florets and no ray florets.  Within that tribe it is most closely related to Conoclinium and Ageratum.

Fleischmannia species were traditionally included as part of the large Eupatorium, recognized in the broad sense based on achenes with five ribs and a pappus of capillary bristles.  Fleischmannia is distinguished morphologically by having the inner surface of the corolla lobes markedly papillate (requires magnification to see), the carpopodia symmetrical and stopper-shaped, and the involucres small and with 3 series of subimbricate bracts.  The number of flowers per head is typically 20 or more (up to 50).  Many species are herbs and somewhat weedy, and have leaves with long petioles.  Although the base chromosome number for the genus is x=10, one species, F. microstemon, is notable for have a chromosome number of x=4, the lowest in tribe Eupatorieae.  A thorough study of Fleischmannia is needed to determine if all of its species are actually distinct and worthy of recognition.

 Species

References

 
Asteraceae genera
Taxonomy articles created by Polbot